Rosita, formerly known as Rosita South, is a census-designated place (CDP) in Maverick County, Texas, United States. The population was 2,704 as of the 2010 census. The Kickapoo Indian Reservation of Texas is located within the community.

Geography
Rosita is located at  (28.624308, -100.433557).

According to the United States Census Bureau, the CDP has a total area of 8.0 square miles (20.6 km2), of which, 7.8 square miles (20.1 km2) of it is land and 0.2 square miles (0.5 km2) of it (2.64%) is water.

Demographics
As of the census of 2000, there were 2,574 people, 624 households, and 577 families residing in the CDP. The population density was 331.7 people per square mile (128.1/km2). There were 762 housing units at an average density of 98.2/sq mi (37.9/km2). The racial makeup of the CDP was 58.39% White, 0.19% African American, 15.97% Native American, 0.12% Pacific Islander, 22.69% from other races, and 2.64% from two or more races. Hispanic or Latino of any race were 83.14% of the population.

There were 624 households, out of which 67.8% had children under the age of 18 living with them, 73.1% were married couples living together, 14.9% had a female householder with no husband present, and 7.5% were non-families. 7.2% of all households were made up of individuals, and 2.6% had someone living alone who was 65 years of age or older. The average household size was 4.11 and the average family size was 4.32.

In the CDP, the population was spread out, with 44.8% under the age of 18, 9.2% from 18 to 24, 28.6% from 25 to 44, 11.6% from 45 to 64, and 5.7% who were 65 years of age or older. The median age was 22 years. For every 100 females, there were 96.6 males. For every 100 females age 18 and over, there were 91.1 males.

The median income for a household in the CDP was $19,536, and the median income for a family was $21,333. Males had a median income of $17,500 versus $18,869 for females. The per capita income for the CDP was $6,157. About 41.7% of families and 41.2% of the population were below the poverty line, including 38.6% of those under age 18 and 78.9% of those age 65 or over.

Education
Rosita is served by the Eagle Pass Independent School District.

References

Census-designated places in Maverick County, Texas
Census-designated places in Texas